A kei is a gong used in Buddhist practice in Japan. Kei were adapted from the ancient Chinese instrument known in English as a "sounding stone"; they share the  same Chinese character.

References

Idiophones
Japanese musical instruments